The 1997 Speedway Conference League (also called the Amateur League), was the third tier/division of British speedway. It reverted to being the third tier because during the previous season it was inadvertently the second tier competition while the British League ran as a single merged division.

Summary
The title was won by Peterborough Thundercats the junior side belonging to Peterborough Panthers. 

The majority of the clubs were the junior sides belonging to their respective senior side or a collaboration ran by their senior sides. The Raven Sprockets were a combination of the Reading Racers and Swindon Robins,  the Western Warriors were a combination of the Exeter Falcons and Newport Wasps, the Shuttle Cubs were Wolverhampton Wolves and Long Eaton Speedway and finally the Anglian Angels were the Ipswich Witches and Rye House Rockets.

Final league table

+ combined team

Other honours
Riders' Championship: Jon Armstrong (Buxton), 13 pts

See also
List of United Kingdom Speedway League Champions
Knockout Cup (speedway)

References

Conference
Speedway Conference League